Hermann Kriebel (20 January 1876 in Germersheim – 16 February 1941 in Munich) was a lieutenant colonel and former Bavarian staff officer.

Life
He fought with the Freikorps during the German Revolution of 1918–19. As a member of the German 1919 Armistice delegation, his parting words were "See you again in 20 years." In 1923 became the military leader of the Kampfbund, the league of nationalist and fighting societies that included Adolf Hitler's Nazi party and SA; the Oberland League; and Ernst Röhm's Reichskriegflagge. Kriebel was, with Hitler and Erich Ludendorff, the key figure in the 8–9 November 1923 Beer Hall Putsch and was convicted with Hitler in 1924, serving his sentence in the Landsberg prison.

In 1929, he arrived in China to work as an arms dealer and an adviser to the Kuomintang government of Chiang Kai-shek. Besides fighting the Chinese Communists, the Kuomintang regime was at the time fighting the armies of Chinese warlords, namely General Feng Yuxiang in the north and the Guangxi clique of General Bai Chongxi and Li Zongren in the south. Accordingly, as China had hardly any arms manufacturing factories of its own at the time, arms had to be imported. Kriebel found that the demand for arms in China was enormous, making the work of an arms dealer very profitable.

After his release from prison, he maintained his ties with the Nazi party and the Oberland League. He became the German consul general in Shanghai.

References

Books and articles

External links
 

1876 births
1941 deaths
People from Germersheim
National Socialist Freedom Movement politicians
Nazi Party politicians
Collaborators who participated in the Beer Hall Putsch
20th-century Freikorps personnel
German diplomats
German Army personnel of World War I
Military personnel of Bavaria
Nazi Party officials
Members of the Reichstag of the Weimar Republic
Members of the Reichstag of Nazi Germany
People from the Palatinate (region)
German nationalists